The shape correction function is a ratio of the surface area of a growing organism and that of an isomorph as function of the volume. The shape of the isomorph is taken to be equal to that of the organism for a given reference volume, so for that particular volume the surface areas are also equal and the shape correction function has value one.

For a volume  and reference volume , the shape correction function  equals:
 V0-morphs: 
 V1-morphs: 
 Isomorphs: 

Static mixtures between a V0 and a V1-morph can be found as:  for 

The shape correction function is used in Dynamic Energy Budget theory to correct equations for isomorphs to organisms that change shape during growth. The conversion is necessary for accurately modelling food (substrate) acquisition and mobilization of reserve for use by metabolism.

References

Developmental biology
Metabolism